The Billboard Music Award for Top Rock Album winners and nominees. This is a newer award. Mumford & Sons and Coldplay won the award twice.

Winners and nominees

Superlatives

Wins
 2 (Coldplay, Imagine Dragons, Mumford & Sons, Twenty One Pilots)

Nominations
 5 (Mumford & Sons); 4 (Coldplay, Imagine Dragons, Twenty One Pilots); 2 (The Black Keys, Lorde, Nickelback, Panic! at the Disco)

References

Billboard awards
Album awards